FC Vaajakoski is an active sports club from Jyväskylä in Finland.  The club was formed in 1993 and their home ground is at the Vaajakosken keskuskenttä.  The men's first team currently plays in the Kakkonen (Second Division).  The Chairman of FCV is Laasi Paavolainen.

Background

The club was established in 1993 and serves the Vaajakoski-Jyskä area of Jyväskylä. The club currently provides for football, floorball and futsal and has over 300 registered players.

In their short history FCV have already had three spells covering 5 seasons in the Kakkonen (Second Division), the third tier of Finnish football in
2003, 2005–06 and 2009 to the present day.

Club Structure

FCV runs 3 men's teams and several boys teams.

Club teams

FCV Men's Team are participating in Kakkonen administered by the Football Association of Finland  (Suomen Palloliitto). It is the third highest tier in the Finnish football system.  In 2009 FCV finished in sixth position in their Kakkonen section.

 FCV Reds are participating in the Vitonen (Fifth Division) section administered by the Keski-Suomi SPL.

2018 season

FCV got promoted to Kakkonen for season 2018, as a result of OPS failing to meet license regulations in Ykkönen and refusing to take part in Kakkonen. Current manager of the squad, Mika Järvinen has been in charge since 2013.

References and sources
Official Website
 Suomen Cup

Footnotes

Football clubs in Finland
Sport in Jyväskylä
1993 establishments in Finland
Association football clubs established in 1993